Miss Russia 2007   was held on December 14, 2007, at Gostinom Yard, Moscow, Russia. Tatiana Kotova of Rostov-on-Don crowned her successor Ksenia Sukhinova of Tyumen as the new Miss Russia. Riyo Mori and Zhang Zilin participated in the event. Ksenia Sukhinova competed in the Miss World 2008 pageant, and was crowned the winner. Although she was not the winner of the national pageant, the Miss Russia organization decided to send the first runner-up, Vera Krasova, to the Miss Universe 2008 pageant held in Nha Trang, Vietnam, where she made it to the top five finalists.

Placement

Special awards 
 Miss Wild Orchid – Valeria Bulatova (Ulyanovsk Oblast)
 Miss Russian Radio – Diana Enikeeva (Khimki)

Contestants

Notes
 Ksenia Sukhinova won the title of Miss World 2008.
 Vera Krasova replaced Ksenia Sukhinova at Miss Universe 2008 where she was the 3rd runner up.

References

External links
 Miss Russia official website

Miss Russia
2007 beauty pageants
2007 in Russia